Erik Fuglestad (born 13 August 1974) is a Norwegian former professional footballer and is currently head coach of Randaberg. During his professional career, Fuglestad played for Viking and Norwich City and made appearances for Norway at the under-21 level.

Player career
Fuglestad, nicknamed "Fuglis", was born in Stavanger and began his senior career with Viking FK, having arrived from Randaberg IL as a junior. He made his debut in a friendly in 1993, and his league debut in the final game of the 1994 season, replacing Øyvind Mellemstrand at left back. Fuglestad's break-through followed in the 1995 season, when he featured in 25 of the club's 26 league games, scoring two goals, both against IK Start in the space of two weeks during July. Being a local lad, Fuglestad excited the Viking following with his attacking style and good crossing.

He remained the first-choice left back at Viking for a further two seasons, before Mike Walker brought him to Norwich City on a Bosman free transfer in November 1997. He made 80 appearances, scoring 2 goals against Sheffield United and Huddersfield, for the Canaries before his contract was cancelled towards the end of the 1999–00 season and he returned to former club Viking.

Upon returning to Norwegian football, Fuglestad retrained as a midfielder, playing both in the centre and on the left wing, and he remained a midfielder for the rest of his career. In the 2001 season, he started all 26 league games for Viking, scoring nine goals. In addition, he scored three goals in six cup games, when his club won the 2001 Norwegian Football Cup, Viking's first cup-win in twelve years. However, he missed the cup final due to an injury. The 2001 Norwegian Cup trophy was his only trophy as a senior footballer.

Fuglestad remained a first-choice midfielder throughout the 2002 season, but he missed all of 2003 through injury. His comeback in 2004 lasted only 15 league games, before a kidney illness forced him into retirement. He remained as an employee of Viking, where he had a role in the administration and was later the head coach of the junior team. An attempted comeback with home club Randaberg IL in 2007 was cut short as Fuglestad's illness returned, and he announced his definitive retirement on 7 August 2007.

Coaching career
Ahead of the 2008 season he went from being coach of Viking FK's junior team to player developer in Bryne FK. In 2012, he became the head coach of Randaberg IL.

References
Canary Citizens by Mark Davage, John Eastwood, Kevin Platt, published by Jarrold Publishing, (2001), 
Drømmen om de mørkeblå by Ole J. Askeland and Arild I. Olsson, published by Stavanger Aftenblad, (1999),

External links

Career information at ex-canaries.co.uk

1974 births
Living people
Sportspeople from Stavanger
Norwegian footballers
Randaberg IL players
Viking FK players
Norwich City F.C. players
Eliteserien players
English Football League players
Expatriate footballers in England
Norwegian expatriate footballers
Norwegian expatriate sportspeople in England
Viking FK non-playing staff
Norwegian football managers
Association football defenders